The 2023 Stockport Metropolitan Borough Council elections are scheduled to take place on 4 May 2023 alongside other local elections in the United Kingdom. Due to boundary changes, all 63 seats on Stockport Metropolitan Borough Council are to be contested.

Background
Stockport began as a Conservative council, with Conservative majorities from 1975 to 1982. The Liberal Democrats (Liberal Party from 1973 to 1988) overtook the Conservatives in 1992, and formed their first administration in 1999, before another period of no overall control from 2000 to 2002 with the second Liberal Democrat majority lasting until 2011. A Labour minority administration replaced the Liberal Democrats in 2016, and survived until 2022, when the Lib Dems increased their lead over the Labour Party and were able to take control of the authority.

In November 2022 the Local Government Boundary Commission for England made The Stockport (Electoral Changes) Order 2022, which officially abolished the 21 existing wards and replaced them with 21 new wards on different boundaries. Because of this change all 63 seats on the council, three per ward, are being contested.

Electoral process 
The election will take place using the plurality block voting system, a form of first-past-the-post voting, with each ward being represented by three councillors. The candidate with the most votes in each ward will serve a four year term ending in 2027, the second-placed candidate will serve a three year term anding in 2026 and the third-placed candidate will serve a one year term ending in 2024.

All registered electors (British, Irish, Commonwealth and European Union citizens) living in Oldham aged 18 or over will be entitled to vote in the election. People who live at two addresses in different councils, such as university students with different term-time and holiday addresses, are entitled to be registered for and vote in elections in both local authorities. Voting in-person at polling stations will take place from 07:00 to 22:00 on election day, and voters will be able to apply for postal votes or proxy votes in advance of the election.

Previous council composition

Candidates  

Asterisks denote incumbent councillors seeking re-election.

Bramhall North

Bramhall South & Woodford

Bredbury & Woodley

Bredbury Green & Romiley

Brinnington & Stockport Central

Cheadle East & Cheadle Hulme North

Cheadle Hulme South

Cheadle West & Gatley

Davenport & Cale Green

Edgeley

Hazel Grove

Heald Green

Heatons North

Heatons South

Manor

Marple North

Marple South & High Lane

Norbury & Woodsmoor

Offerton

Reddish North

Reddish South

References

Stockport
Stockport Metropolitan Borough Council elections